We Smoked It All is a 2009 collaboration mixtape by rappers Spose and Cam Groves from the independent label PDANK. 

2009 mixtape albums